Vistas are a Scottish indie rock band from Edinburgh, Scotland. They released their debut studio album Everything Changes in the End in May 2020. The group consists of Prentice Robertson, Dylan Rush and Jamie Law.

Career
The band formed at school and developed a tight bond. They released their debut single, "Calm" on 23 March 2018. They released the single "Retrospect" in May 2018. Their debut EP, Hello was released on 26 July 2019. They released "Teenage Blues" on 26 November 2019 as the lead single from their debut studio album. "Sucker" was re-released as second single from their debut studio album. Everything Changes in the End was released as their debut studio album on 29 May 2020.The album peaked at number two on the Scottish Albums Chart and number twenty-one on the UK Albums Chart. They released their album "What Were You Hoping To Find?" on 20 August 2021. In October 2022 they released their most recent single "Follow you down"

Members
 Prentice Robertson – vocals (2016–present)
 Dylan Rush – guitar (2016–present)
 Jamie Law – bassist (2016–present)

Discography

Studio albums

Extended plays

Singles

References

Scottish alternative rock groups
Scottish indie rock groups
Musicians from Edinburgh